Robert "Robin" Page Arnot (15 December 1890 – 18 May 1986), best known as R. Page Arnot, was a British Communist journalist and politician.

Early years
Robert Page Arnot, known to his friends as "Robin", was born in 1890 at Greenock, the son of a newspaper editor. He attended Glasgow University where he helped to form the University Socialist Federation in 1912, along with G.D.H. Cole and others. He also wrote for the Labour Leader, publication of the Independent Labour Party, using the pseudonym "Jack Cade."

In 1912 the Fabian socialist Beatrice Webb established a Committee of Enquiry into the future control of industry. Out of this sprang the Fabian Research Department, which later evolved into the Labour Research Department. One of the volunteers attracted by the project was Robin Page Arnot, who became its full-time head in 1914 – a position which he retained until 1926.

In 1916 Arnot refused conscription to the British army and was imprisoned as a conscientious objector; he accepted transfer to the Home Office Scheme, and served some two years in the Wakefield Work Centre. When he was freed in 1919, he returned to his post as the Secretary of the Labour Research Department. In 1919, in response to labour unrest in the coal mines, the British government established a Committee of Inquiry. The Miners' Federation sought the aid of the Labour Research Department in marshalling evidence on behalf of the workers' demand for higher wages, shorter hours, and government ownership of the mines.

Political career
Arnot was a foundation member of the Communist Party of Great Britain in 1920. Coming as he did from a background as a guild socialist, Arnot favoured close integration of the Communist Party with the broader labour movement, including affiliation as a member organisation under the Labour Party's umbrella.

He was a co-founder, along with R. Palme Dutt and W.N. Ewer, of the Labour Monthly, and a regular contributor and assistant editor for that journal throughout its long history.

In 1925 Arnot was among the 12 Communists charged under the Incitement to Mutiny Act 1797. He was found guilty and jailed for six months, to be released on the eve of the 1926 General Strike. During the General Strike he helped to form the Northumberland and Durham Joint Strike Committee. After the failure of the strike, Arnot returned to the Labour Research Department as its Director of Research and wrote a book on the general strike.

R. Page Arnot was a fixture on the governing Central Committee of the CPGB. He was elected to the Central Committee by the party's 9th Congress in 1927, and returned by the 10th Congress of January 1929, the 11th Congress of December 1929, the 12th Congress of 1932, the 13th Congress of 1935, and the 14th Congress of 1937. However, he was not among the 24 members elected by the 15th Congress of 1938.

Arnot was elected as a delegate to the 6th World Congress of the Communist International ("Comintern"), held in Moscow in 1928.

Arnot defended the Moscow Trials in Labour Monthly and chastised both the Manchester Guardian and the politician Emrys Hughes for their criticism of the Trials.

Postwar
Arnot was a prolific pamphleteer and author and wrote a six-volume history of the British mineworkers from 1949 to 1975.
He was elected to the LRD's Executive in 1938 and was re-elected every year until 1976 when he was made Honorary President. He wrote six volumes of miners' history between 1949 and 1975. Arnot died in 1986 aged 96, from 1984 publicly and openly fighting the revisionist trend that was taking control of the CPGB even to the end.

Although he now no longer held a post in either the Communist Party or the N.U.M., he continued to pour his enormous energy, breadth of interests and encyclopaedic knowledge into The Labour Monthly, which continued to maintain more influence than number of members on the thinking of the British Communist. His private collection of Labour Movement documents was astounding: for example, a hand-written notebook which had once belonged to David Moffatt, grandfather of Alex and Abe Moffatt (the Scottish trades union leaders) who had been hounded from coal-mine to coal-mine down the northeastern coast of Britain by one vinctive mine-owner after another. On one side of the n the accounts of whichever branch of the N.U.M. he happened to be working at, while on the reverse side there were extensive notes not only from Marx and Engels but also from Ruskin, John Stuart Mill, Charles Darwin, T.H. Huxley, Herbert Spencer and H.G. Wells, to name but a few. Robin cherished the volume which he pulled out from time to time to demonstrate to his guest precisely what the self-educating, culturally aspiring working-men of the 19th century - the founders of the Labour Party - were like.
Arnot was also arrested in 1986 and accused of being a spy for the Soviet Union. He was released in what seemed to many as a cover-up and a bribe. He was seen meeting with a Soviet Intelligence Officer multiple times. He denied the accusations and M15 (British Counter-Intelligence agency) conducted an Investigation the results of which are still Classified and not set to be released until 2056.

Death
Arnot died in 1986 at the age of 95, leaving behind his lifelong comrade, companion and wife, Violet.

Footnotes

Publications by R. Page Arnot
 Trade Unionism on the Railways: Its History and Problems. With G.D.H. Cole. London: George Allen and Unwin, 1917.
 Nationalisation of the Mines. n.c. [London]: Daily Herald, n.d. [1919].
 Facts from the Coal Commission. Westminster: Labour Research Department, n.d. [1919].
 Further Facts from the Coal Commission: Being a History of the Second Stage of the Coal Industry Commission, with Excerpts from the Evidence. London: Allen and Unwin, n.d. [1919].
 The Russian Revolution: A Narrative and a Guide for Reading. London: Labour Research Department, 1923.
 Fight the Slave Plan: The Dawes Plan Exposed. London: Communist Party of Great Britain, n.d. [c. 1924].
 The Politics of Oil: An Example of Imperialist Monopoly. London: Labour Research Department, 1924.
 The General Strike, May 1926: Its Origin and History. London: Labour Research Department, 1926.
 The General Strike and the Miners' Struggle. London: Labour Research Department, 1926.
 History of the Labour Research Department. London: Labour Research Department, 1926.
 Exit: The Trade Disputes Act. London: Labour Research Department, n.d. [c. 1927].
 Soviet Russia and Her Neighbors. With Jerome Davis. New York: Vanguard Press, 1927.
 How Britain Rules India. London: Communist Party of Great Britain, 1929.
 Slavery or Socialism? London: Communist Party of Great Britain, n.d. [c. 1934].
 William Morris: A Vindication. London: Martin Lawrence, 1934.
 A Short History of the Russian Revolution from 1905 to the Present Day. In Two Volumes. London: Victor Gollancz, 1937.
 Fascist Agents Exposed in the Moscow Trials. London: Communist Party of Great Britain, 1938.
 Twenty Years: The Policy of the Communist Party of Great Britain from its Foundation, July 31st, 1920. London: Lawrence and Wishart, 1940.
 Soviet Leaders: Stalin. Sydney: Current Book Distributors, n.d. [1942].
 1917-1942: From Tsardom to Soviet Power. London: Russia Today Society, 1942.
 Japan. London: Labour Monthly, n.d. [c. 1942].
 Japan: Strength and Weaknesses. London: Trinity Trust, 1942.
 What is Common Wealth? London: Communist Party of Great Britain, 1943.
 There are No Aryans: A Popular Study of the Bogus Race Doctrines of the Nazis (and Others) in the LIght of Reason and Scientific Facts, with Special Reference to Anti-Semitism. London: Labour Monthly, n.d. [1943]. Australian edition: Sydney: Current Book Distributors, 1944.
 May Day 1945. London: Communist Party of Great Britain, 1945.
 The Miners: A History of the Miners' Federation of Great Britain, 1889–1910. London: Allen and Unwin, 1949.
 Bernard Shaw and William Morris: A Lecture, Given on May 11, 1956. London: William Morris Society, 1957.
 The Impact of the Russian Revolution in Britain. London: Lawrence and Wishart, 1967.
 South Wales Miners, Glowyr de Cymru: A History of the South Wales Miners' Federation (1914–1926). Cardiff : Cymric Federation Press, 1975.
 The Miners: One Union, One Industry: A History of the National Union of Mineworkers, 1939–46. London: Allen and Unwin, 1979.

External links
 
 R. Page Arnot Archive, Marxists Internet Archive. Retrieved 29 Aug. 2009.
 Works by R. Page Arnot, The Open Library. Retrieved 29 Aug. 2009.

1890 births
1986 deaths
British conscientious objectors
Communist Party of Great Britain members
Marxist writers